Francesco Maria Farnese (15 August 1619 – 12 July 1647) was an Italian Roman Catholic cardinal.

He was born in Parma, the son of Ranuccio I Farnese, duke of Parma, and Margherita Aldobrandini, niece of Pope Clement VIII. He was appointed as cardinal by Pope Innocent X in 1644, but he never came to Rome to receive the cardinalatial hat. After the death of his brother Odoardo I Farnese in 1646, Francesco Maria acted for two years as regent of the Duchy of Parma of Piacenza for his nephew Ranuccio II.

He died at Parma in 1647.

References

House of Farnese
17th-century Italian cardinals
Religious leaders from Parma
1619 births
1647 deaths
Burials at the Sanctuary of Santa Maria della Steccata
Sons of monarchs